Trevor James Harrop (19 April 1927 – 9 April 2022) was a British swimmer. He was born in Winnipeg, Manitoba, Canada. He later went on to practice dentistry in Vancouver, B.C., Canada. He competed for Great Britain at the 1948 Summer Olympics.

References
Olympedia
New Denver Olympian recalls '48 games

1927 births
2022 deaths
British male swimmers
Canadian male swimmers
Swimmers from Winnipeg
Olympic swimmers of Great Britain
Swimmers at the 1948 Summer Olympics